Waterloo is a historic home located at Princess Anne, Somerset County, Maryland. It is a two-story four-room plan Flemish bond brick house, Georgian-period brick house built about 1750-1760 by Henry Waggaman.  It features a Corinthian columned porch with a roof top balustrade.  Also on the property is a group of outbuildings including a doctor's office, a five-car garage, a frame caretaker's house, a small pump house, and the Waggaman-Riggin family cemetery. During the 19th century the property was owned by several locally prominent families until 1864, when the farm was purchased by the county for an almshouse. The county retained ownership of the property until 1948. The house was operated as a Bed & Breakfast for several years, but is now under private ownership.

It was listed on the National Register of Historic Places in 1986.

References

External links
, including photo from 1985, at Maryland Historical Trust

Houses in Somerset County, Maryland
Houses on the National Register of Historic Places in Maryland
Houses completed in 1750
Georgian architecture in Maryland
National Register of Historic Places in Somerset County, Maryland